The 5th Pan American Junior Athletics Championships were held in Santa Fe, Argentina, on June 23–25, 1989.

Participation (unofficial)

Detailed result lists can be found on the "World Junior Athletics History" website.  An unofficial count yields the number of about 280 athletes from about 16 countries:  Argentina (46), Bahamas (8), Bolivia (4), Brazil (31), Canada (26), Chile (21), Colombia (4), Cuba (28), Ecuador (8), Mexico (23), Paraguay (8), Peru (6), Puerto Rico (2), United States (34), Uruguay (10), Venezuela (21).

Medal summary
Medal winners are published.
Complete results can be found on the "World Junior Athletics History"
website.

Men

Women

Medal table (unofficial)

References

External links
World Junior Athletics History

Pan American U20 Athletics Championships
Pan American Junior Athletics Championships
Pan American Junior Athletics Championships
International athletics competitions hosted by Argentina
Pan American Junior Athletics Championships